Lyons is an unincorporated community and census-designated place (CDP) in Burleson County, Texas, United States. It was first listed as a CDP in the 2020 census with a population of 236. Lyons has a post office with the ZIP code 77863.

References

External links
 

Unincorporated communities in Burleson County, Texas
Unincorporated communities in Texas
Census-designated places in Burleson County, Texas
Census-designated places in Texas
Bryan–College Station